The Majiacun Formation is a Santonian to Coniacian geologic formation in China. Dinosaur remains are among the fossils that have been recovered from the formation.

Paleofauna 
 Bactrosaurus (remains originally known as Bakesaurus)
 Mosaiceratops azumai
 Xixiasaurus henanensis
 Xixianykus zhangi
 Yunxianosaurus hubeinensis
 Zhanghenglong yangchengensis
 Baryonychinae indet.? (possibly an indeterminate theropod due to no shared synapomorphies present)

Fossil eggs
 Dendroolithus sanlimiaoensis
 Prismatoolithus gebiensis
 Ovaloolithus sp.
 Spheroolithus sp.
 Nanyangosaurus zhugeii
 Youngoolithus xiaguanensis

Ichnofossils
 Scoyenia sp.

See also 
 List of dinosaur-bearing rock formations
 List of stratigraphic units with few dinosaur genera

References

Bibliography 

 
 
    
 
 
 
 
 
 

Geologic formations of China
Upper Cretaceous Series of Asia
Cretaceous China
Santonian Stage
Coniacian Stage
Mudstone formations
Sandstone formations
Fluvial deposits
Ichnofossiliferous formations
Ooliferous formations
Paleontology in Henan
Paleontology in Hubei